Wonderland is an upcoming South Korean sci-fi fantasy film written and directed by Kim Tae-yong. The film starring Bae Suzy, Choi Woo-shik, Jung Yu-mi, Park Bo-gum, and Tang Wei,<ref name="10asia">{{Cite news |url =https://tenasia.hankyung.com/movie/article/2020031302994#_enliple|title =[단독]박보검·수지·공유·탕웨이·정유미·최우식 '원더랜드' 넷플릭스로 해외공개|trans-title=[TEN Issue] "These actors are in a movie?"...'WonderlandAlien' Unbelievable express lineup|work =Ten Asia |author= Noh Gyu-min |publisher = Hankyung|date = March 13, 2020|access-date=December 5, 2020|language=ko}}</ref> is a story of a virtual world 'Wonderland'. It is a simulated place for people to reunite with a person they may not meet again by using artificial intelligence. The film was slated to be released in South Korea and China sometime in 2022.

Synopsis
'Wonderland' is a titular virtual world, a place for people to reunite with a person they may not meet again, by simulating them through artificial intelligence. A woman in her 20s requests to meet her lover, who is in a vegetative state, and a man in his 40s requests to meet his deceased wife.

Cast
Main
In alphabetical order
 Bae Suzy  as a woman in 20s
 Choi Woo-shik as coordinator of 'Wonderland'
 Jung Yu-mi as coordinator of 'Wonderland'
 Park Bo-gum as a man in 20s
 Tang Wei as a woman in 40s

Supporting
 Son Kyung-won
 Jeon Su-ji as Jung-in's senior

Special appearance
 Gong Yoo as a man in 40s
 Choi Moo-sung

Production
Development
The project was conceived in June 2019. Kim Tae-yong who wrote the screenplay, is directing the film after 9 years. He directed his last film  Late Autumn'' in 2010.

Casting
On June 26, 2019, Bae Suzy received an offer to appear in the film. On July 2, 2019, Choi Woo-shik's agency reported that they are considering proposal of appearance in the film positively. On 25 September 2019, Park Bo-gum's agency Blossom Entertainment reported that they are reviewing the offer of appearance in the film. In August 2019, representative from production team reported that Tang Wei was considering the offer of lead role in her husband's film. On November 11, 2019 it was reported that Jung Yu-mi has joined the cast of the film. On 11 March, 2020 it was reported that Gong Yoo is considering the role of Tang Wei's husband.

Filming
Principal photography began in April 2020. In July 2020 the film was shot in studios in Paju, Gyeonggi Province and Jeonju. Filming was completed in September 2020, except for some scenes featuring Tang Wei, which are yet to be filmed, and scheduled for filming in January 2021.

Release
On October 22, 2020, distributors Acemaker Movieworks and Netflix reached an agreement that the film will be released worldwide by Netflix except in South Korea and China. Netflix disclosed that they were in discussion with Acemaker for overseas releases since the beginning of the filming. After long negotiations, Acemaker finally agreed to a contract with Netflix for about 30% of post-production cost. The film is planned to be released on Netflix.

References

External links
 
 
 

Upcoming films
2020s Korean-language films
South Korean science fantasy films
Films about artificial intelligence
Films about virtual reality
Films about simulated reality
Films directed by Kim Tae-yong